António Vicente Lopes (d. 1987), better known as Antoninho Travadinha was one of the major autodidactic musicians of Cape Verde originated from Janela in Paúl the island of Santo Antão.

He performed the popular dances when he was only nine years old, and made himself internationally famous when he became forty, by the time he undertook a tournée in Portugal. One of his albums was recorded in Lisbon at the Hot Club (oldest Jazz Club in Portugal).

Other than the violin, Travadinha played wonderfully well with the twelve string guitar, the cavaquinho and the guitar.  Travadinha interpreted traditional music styles of Cape Verde including the morna and coladera.  One of his songs Travadinha made was "Feiticeira di côr Morena".

He died in 1987 when he reached great popularity.

Works
Le violon du Cap Vert, Buda musique, Paris, Universal, 1992

External links
Music of Cape Verde: Travadinha at Mindelo Infos 

Year of birth missing
1987 deaths
Cape Verdean musicians
People from Santo Antão, Cape Verde
Morna (music) singers
Coladeira singers